Anbar Dan or Anbardan may refer to:
 Anbar Dan, Bostanabad
 Anbardan, Charuymaq